Leroy Township is one of twenty townships in Benton County, Iowa, USA.  At the 2000 census, its population was 1,099.

Geography
According to the United States Census Bureau, Leroy Township covers an area of 35.78 square miles (92.67 square kilometers); of this, 35.7 square miles (92.47 square kilometers, 99.78 percent) is land and 0.08 square miles (0.2 square kilometers, 0.22 percent) is water.

Cities, towns, villages
 Blairstown
 Luzerne (east half)

Adjacent townships
 Union Township (north)
 Eldorado Township (northeast)
 St. Clair Township (east)
 Washington Township, Iowa County (southeast)
 Marengo Township, Iowa County (south)
 Honey Creek Township, Iowa County (southwest)
 Iowa Township (west)
 Kane Township (northwest)

Cemeteries
The township contains these four cemeteries: International, Old International, Pleasant Hill and Stringtown (historical).

Lakes
 Hannen Lake

Landmarks
 Hannen Park

School districts
 Belle Plaine Community School District
 Benton Community School District

Political districts
 Iowa's 3rd congressional district
 State House District 39
 State Senate District 20

References
 United States Census Bureau 2007 TIGER/Line Shapefiles
 United States Board on Geographic Names (GNIS)
 United States National Atlas

External links

 
US-Counties.com
City-Data.com

Townships in Benton County, Iowa
Cedar Rapids, Iowa metropolitan area
Townships in Iowa